The following lists of golfers are arranged by gender:
List of male golfers
List of female golfers

Golfers who have won a major championship or Olympic medal
 List of men's major championships winning golfers
 Chronological list of men's major golf champions
 List of LPGA major championship winning golfers
 Chronological list of LPGA major golf champions
 List of Champions Tour major championship winning golfers
 List of Olympic medalists in golf

Golfers with the most wins on a professional golf tour
 List of golfers with most Asian Tour wins
 List of golfers with most Challenge Tour wins
 List of golfers with most European Tour wins
 List of golfers with most European Senior Tour wins
 List of golfers with most Japan Golf Tour wins
 List of golfers with most Ladies European Tour wins
 List of golfers with most LPGA of Japan Tour wins
 List of golfers with most LPGA Tour wins
 List of golfers with most PGA Tour wins
 List of golfers with most PGA Tour Champions wins
 List of golfers with most Korn Ferry Tour wins

Golfers who have played in major team competitions
List of American Ryder Cup golfers
List of European Ryder Cup golfers
List of American Presidents Cup golfers
List of International Presidents Cup golfers
List of American Solheim Cup golfers
List of European Solheim Cup golfers
List of American Walker Cup golfers
List of Great Britain and Ireland Walker Cup golfers
List of American Curtis Cup golfers
List of Great Britain and Ireland Curtis Cup golfers
List of American Arnold Palmer Cup golfers
List of International Arnold Palmer Cup golfers
List of American PGA Cup golfers
List of Great Britain and Ireland PGA Cup golfers
List of Continental Europe Seve Trophy golfers
List of Great Britain and Ireland Seve Trophy golfers

Others
 List of world number one male golfers
 List of male golfers who have been in the world top 10